Francis Xavier Engineering College, Tirunelveli, is an Autonomous institution located in the town of Tirunelveli in the state of Tamil Nadu. Tirunelveli is often referred as the 'Oxford of south India' due to the larger number of educational institutions present. The Francis Xavier Engineering College popularly known as FX Engineering College, was established in the year 2000.

Curriculum 

The institute offers eight undergraduate and ten postgraduate programs.

Undergraduate 

 B.E Civil Engineering
 B.E Computer Science and Engineering
 B.E Electronics and Communication Engineering
 B.E Electrical and Electronics Engineering
 B.Tech Information Technology
 B.E Mechanical Engineering
 B.Tech Artificial Intelligence and Data Science
 B.Tech Computer Science and Business Systems

Postgraduate 

 M.E Communication Systems
 M.E Computer Science and Engineering
 M.E CSE with specialization in Networks
 M.E Power Electronics and Drives
 M.E Power Systems
 M.E VLSI Design
 M.E Industrial Safety Engineering
 M.Tech Information Technology
 MCA - Master of Computer Application
 MBA - Master of Business Administration

Departments 
 Department of Civil Engineering
 Department of Computer Science and Engineering
 Department of Electrical and Electronics Engineering
 Department of Electronics and Communication Engineering
 Department of Information Technology
 Department of Mechanical Engineering
 Department of Management Studies
 Department of Computer Application
 Department of Science and Humanities

Hostels 
The College has a separate hostel for boys and girls.

See also 

 List of Engineering Colleges in Tamil Nadu
 National Board of Accreditation 
 Anna University Affiliated Colleges

References

Engineering colleges in Tamil Nadu
Colleges affiliated to Anna University
Education in Tirunelveli
Educational institutions established in 1981
1981 establishments in Tamil Nadu